Avtaar is a 1983 drama film starring Rajesh Khanna and Shabana Azmi. It was directed by Mohan Kumar, and the music was by  Laxmikant Pyarelal, and lyrics by Anand Bakshi. Avtaar was a commercial hit, and was critically acclaimed.  The film earned several Filmfare award nominations. Rajesh Khanna achieved success with Amardeep and Prem Bandhan onwards, but this was Rajesh Khanna's biggest film in terms of box office collections since 1973. However, Rajesh Khanna lost the Best Actor award to Naseeruddin Shah for Masoom. In 1986, Mohan Kumar made Amrit with Rajesh Khanna in the lead as an old man, but with a different story line. Rajesh Khanna received an All-India Critics Association (AICA) Best Actor Award for his performance in this film in 1983.

The film was later remade into the Telugu film O Thandri Theerpu (1985), starring Murali Mohan and Jayasudha; in Kannada as Kaliyuga, starring Rajesh and Aarthi; in Malayalam as Jeevitham, starring Madhu; and in Tamil as Vaazhkai, with Sivaji Ganesan.

Plot

The film starts with wife Radha Kishen (Shabana Azmi) garlanding her husband Avtaar Kishen's (Rajesh Khanna) bust while she mourns his death, then flashes back thirty years. Radha, is the only daughter of Seth Jugal Kishore (Madan Puri), and is in love with Avtaar, a poor boy. Her father disapproves, so the two elope and marry.

After various hardships, the couple ultimately succeed; after three decades, Avtaar is owner of a small house and fortune. they have two sons, Chander (Gulshan Grover) and Ramesh (Shashi Puri). Chander is married to Renu (Rajni Sharma), while Ramesh is married to Sudha (Priti Sapru). Avtaar also has a servant named Sewak (Sachin).

Chander marries the only daughter of Seth Laxmi Narayan (Pinchoo Kapoor) and becomes a Gharjamai. Meanwhile Ramesh registers the house under his wife's  name instead of Radha's. This enrages Avtaar and he leaves his home, accompanied by Radha and Sewak. With help of a moneylender Bawaji (Sujit Kumar), Avtaar starts his own garage.

Avtaar faces an uphill task, since he has no money to buy equipment, is aged and his right hand was paralysed in an accident. Sewak helps his master by illegally donating blood to arrange funds, but when Avtaar assumes Sewak has resorted to asking help from Avtaar's sons, Bawaji tells the truth. Moved, Radha and Avtaar come to regard him as a true son.

Meanwhile, Avtaar's best friend Rashid Ahmed is also suffering under his cruel son Anwar and his cruel daughter-in-law, Zubeida. His son was in Dubai and he always shows before the panwaala shop run by Ram dulare (Shivraj) that his daughter-in-law is very good but in reality she is horrible. Rashid works like a servant and suddenly becomes sick and his son expels him from the house. Avtaar sees this and opens a center for people who are suffering from their cruel relatives and he names it "Apna Ghar".

Meanwhile, both Ramesh and Chander are enjoying their lives. Avtaar's luck changes and the carburetor he is working on gives a successful result. Avtaar starts manufacturing the engine parts, and creates an industrial empire headed by himself, his wife and Sewak.

Avtaar's success takes a toll on Laxmi Narayan's business and he holds Chander responsible. Ramesh commits bank fraud and is arrested. Sudha comes to Avtaar for help, but he rebukes her and sends her away. Radha becomes angry, but remains silent. Avtaar secretly gives Bawaji the bail money on the condition that he tells no one; Bawaji bails Ramesh.

Meanwhile, holding Chandar responsible for the loss in business, Laxmi Narayan throws him out of the house. Ramesh, Chandar and Sudha go to Radha for assistance, but Avtaar disagrees. Next day, Avtaar goes to the office and does not return. Radha calls him and late at night, tries to convince him to help their children, but he refuses to listen. Emotionally, Radha accuses him of having become heartless. Bawaji meets Radha, who tells him the whole story. Bawaji confesses the truth to her as he cannot bear Avtaar being ill thought of. Meanwhile, Zubeida learns that Rashid is having a lot of money by working in Apna Ghar. So Anwar and Zubaida come with their son Saddu to Ahmed Rashid. Zubeida and Anwar act a drama in front of Rashid so they can get money from him but he asks them to leave.

After learning the truth, Radha realizes her mistake and tries to call Avtaar. Sewak informs her that Avtaar has had a heart attack, so the family goes to the hospital. Avtaar has already written his will. He hands it to Radha and dies. He gave 2 lakhs to both of his sons only because of their mistreatment that led to him becoming a successful businessman in the fire of agony and considered Sewak as his actual son who does his final rites. The story comes to the present, where Radha decorates Avtaar's bust because he developed the Apna Ghar center.

Cast
Rajesh Khanna as Avtaar Kishan
Shabana Azmi as Radha Kishan/Radha Kishore (Avtaar's Wife)
Madan Puri as Seth Jugal Kishore (Radha's Father)
Sujit Kumar as Bawaji (Avtaar's Mentor)
A. K. Hangal as Rashid Ahmed (Avtaar's Best Friend)
Sachin as Sewak (Avtaar's Servant and adopted son)
Gulshan Grover as Chander Kishan (Avtaar's Younger Son & Renu's Husband)
Shashi Puri as Ramesh Kishan (Avtaar's Elder Son & Sudha's Husband)
Priti Sapru as Sudha Kishan (Ramesh's Wife)
Rajni Sharma as Renu C. Kishan/Renu Narayan (Chander's Wife .)
Ranjan Grewal as Anwar R. Ahmed (Rashid's Son)
Madhu Malini as Zubeida Anwar Ahmed (Anwar's Wife)
Pinchoo Kapoor as Seth Laxmi Narayan (Renu's Father)
Yunus Parvez as Ram Dulare Chaurasia, Paanwala (Avtaar's Friend)
Shivraj as Gopal (Avtaar's Servant)

Soundtrack
Lyrics: Anand Bakshi

Awards

 31st Filmfare Awards:

Nominated

 Best Film – Emkay Enterprises
 Best Director – Mohan Kumar
 Best Actor – Rajesh Khanna
 Best Actress – Shabana Azmi
 Best Story – Mohan Kumar

References

External links

1983 films
1980s Hindi-language films
Films scored by Laxmikant–Pyarelal
Hindi films remade in other languages
Films directed by Mohan Kumar